Hugo Ball (22 February 1886 – 14 September 1927) was a German author, poet, and essentially the founder of the Dada movement in European art in Zürich in 1916. Among other accomplishments, he was a pioneer in the development of sound poetry.

Life and work 
Hugo Ball was born in Pirmasens, Germany, and was raised in a middle-class Catholic family. He studied sociology and philosophy at the universities of Munich and Heidelberg (1906–1907). In 1910, he moved to Berlin in order to become an actor and collaborated with Max Reinhardt. At the beginning of World War I, he tried joining the army as a volunteer, but was denied enlistment for medical reasons. After witnessing the invasion of Belgium, he was disillusioned, saying: "The war is founded on a glaring mistake – men have been confused with machines." Considered a traitor in his country, he crossed the frontier with the cabaret performer and poet Emmy Hennings, whom he would marry in 1920, and settled in Zürich, Switzerland. There, Ball continued his interest in anarchism and in Mikhail Bakunin in particular; he also worked on a book of translations of works by Bakunin, which never got published. Although interested in anarchist philosophy, he nonetheless rejected it for its militant aspects, and viewed it as only a means to his personal goal of socio-political enlightenment.

In 1916, Hugo Ball created the Dada Manifesto, making a political statement about his views on the terrible state of society and acknowledging his dislike for philosophies of the past that claimed to possess the ultimate truth. In the manifesto Ball aimed to legitimize the new artistic movement's ambition to not merely "write poetry with words", but to "write poetry out of the words", to create an entirely new language, due to the fact that the old language was viewed as "doomed", and "ruined by the filthy hands of capital". The central thought of modernism since Baudelaire regarding that the language has to be fixed, is here given a distinctive critique of economy as a motivation. The same year as the Manifesto, in 1916, Ball wrote his poem "," a poem consisting of nonsensical words. The meaning, however, resides in its meaninglessness, reflecting the chief principle behind Dadaism. Some of his other best known works include the poem collection , the drama , a memoir of the Zürich period Flight Out of Time: A Dada Diary, and a biography of Hermann Hesse, entitled  (1927).

As co-founder of the Cabaret Voltaire and a magazine with the same name, Cabaret Voltaire, in Zürich, he led the Dada movement in Zürich and is one of the people credited with naming the movement "Dada," by allegedly choosing the word at random from a dictionary. His companion and future wife, Emmy Hennings, was also a member of Dada.

His involvement with the Dada movement lasted approximately two years. After returning to Catholicism in July 1920, Ball retired to the canton of Ticino, where he lived a religious and relatively poor life with Emmy Hennings. He contributed to the journal Hochland during this time. He also began the process of revising his diaries from 1910 to 1921, which were later published under the title Die Flucht aus der Zeit (Flight Out of Time). These diaries provide a wealth of information concerning the people and events of the Zürich Dada movement. He died in Sant'Abbondio (Gentilino), Switzerland, of stomach cancer on 14 September 1927.

Adaptations
Ball's poem "Gadji beri bimba" was adapted to the song "I Zimbra" on the 1979 Talking Heads album Fear of Music. Ball received a writing credit for the song on the track listing.

The song contains these lines:
Gadji beri bimba clandridi
Lauli lonni cadori gadjam
A bim beri glassala glandride
E glassala tuffm I zimbra

The complete "Gadji beri bimba" poem by Ball reads:
gadji beri bimba glandridi laula lonni cadori
gadjama gramma berida bimbala glandri galassassa laulitalomini
gadji beri bin blassa glassala laula lonni cadorsu sassala bim
gadjama tuffm i zimzalla binban gligla wowolimai bin beri ban
o katalominai rhinozerossola hopsamen laulitalomini hoooo
gadjama rhinozerossola hopsamen
bluku terullala blaulala loooo

zimzim urullala zimzim urullala zimzim zanzibar zimzalla zam
elifantolim brussala bulomen brussala bulomen tromtata
velo da bang band affalo purzamai affalo purzamai lengado tor
gadjama bimbalo glandridi glassala zingtata pimpalo ögrögöööö
viola laxato viola zimbrabim viola uli paluji malooo

tuffm im zimbrabim negramai bumbalo negramai bumbalo tuffm i zim
gadjama bimbala oo beri gadjama gaga di gadjama affalo pinx
gaga di bumbalo bumbalo gadjamen
gaga di bling blong
gaga blung

A voice-cut-up collage of his poem "Karawane" by German artist Kommissar Hjuler, member of Boris Lurie's NO!art movement, was released on an LP on the Greek Shamanic Trance label in 2010. "Karawane" was also set to music in 2012 by Australian composer Stephen Whittington, as an "anti-song cycle" of seventeen songs — one for each line of the poem, lasting approximately two minutes each. The same poem and its historical context was used by Esa-Pekka Salonen for his 28-minute composition for mixed choir and orchestra, Karawane.

Anti-Semitism 
In 1919, the book On the Critique of the German Intelligentsia was released. In it, Ball blames the German philosophers for the disaster of World War I saying that "together [they] created a morally bankrupt modern ideology, isolated from democratic and liberal trends in western Europe and America, and steeped in traditions of dynastic absolutism and militarism."

Included in the book is his anti-semitism including his use of the derogatory phrase "Jewish Junker Conspiracy." The book was edited over the years to remove certain anti-Semitic sections, particularly after World War II, but the original publication has been reprinted and his views on Jews becoming public knowledge once again.

In 2022, the Hugo Ball Award announced it would not be giving an award that year to winners Hito Steyerl and Olivia Werzel instead deciding to take a step back and rethink having an award named after someone who has a murky past with anti-semitism.

The city of Pirmasens which gives out the award posted on their website: “Anti-Semitic ideas were widespread in the early 20th century, and many artists also promoted such resentment. Hugo Ball did the same, for example in his 1919 publication On the Critique of the German Intelligentsia.”

Bibliography 
Die Nase des Michelangelo. Tragikomödie in vier Auftritten, 1911
Der Henker von Brescia. Drei Akte der Not und Ekstase, 1914
Flametti oder Vom Dandysmus der Armen. Roman. Reiss, Berlin 1918
Zur Kritik der deutschen Intelligenz. Der Freie Verlag, Bern 1919
redeveloped as: Die Folgen der Reformation. Duncker & Humblot, München 1924
Byzantinisches Christentum. Drei Heiligenleben (on Joannes Klimax, Dionysius Areopagita und Symeon dem Styliten). Duncker & Humblot, München 1923
Hermann Hesse. Sein Leben und sein Werk. S. Fischer, Berlin 1927
Die Flucht aus der Zeit (Diary). Duncker & Humblot, München 1927
Gesammelte Gedichte mit Photos und Faksimiles, ed.. Annemarie Schütt-Hennings. Arche, Zürich 1963
Tenderenda der Phantast. Roman. Arche, Zürich 1967

Bibliography in English
 
 
 Blago Bung, Blago Bung, Hugo Ball's Tenderenda the Fantast, Richard Huelsenbeck's Fantastic Prayers, and Walter Serner's Last Loosening – three key texts of Zürich ur-Dada. Translated and introduced by Malcolm Green. Atlas Press, 
 Flametti, or The Dandyism of the Poor, trans. Catherine Schelbert, Wakefield Press, Massachusetts, 2014,

See also 

 Hans Arp
 Richard Huelsenbeck
 Hans Leybold
 Hans Richter
 Walter Serner
 Tristan Tzara

References

External links 

 
 
 
 
 
 International Dada Archive
 Hugo Ball (DADA Companion)
 Opening-Manifest of the 1st Dada-Evening by Hugo Ball
 , Ball recites "Karawane", 1916 (at 2:32)
 Sound recordings of the poems of Hugo Ball on UbuWeb

1886 births
1927 deaths
People from Pirmasens
People from the Palatinate (region)
German Roman Catholics
20th-century German poets
Writers from Rhineland-Palatinate
Dada
German male poets
German-language poets
Modernist theatre
20th-century German male writers
German dadaists
Critics of political economy
German magazine founders